Trompeteros Airport  is an airport serving the town of Trompeteros in the Loreto Region of Peru. The airport runs along the south bank of the Corrientes River.

The Corrientes/Trompeteros VOR-DME (Ident: TRO) and Corrientes/Trompeteros non-directional beacon (Ident: TRO) are located on the field.

See also

Transport in Peru
List of airports in Peru

References

External links
OpenStreetMap - Trompeteros
OurAirports - Trompeteros
SkyVector - Trompeteros

Airports in Peru
Buildings and structures in Loreto Region